Lucky Blondo (born Gerard Blondiot, 23 July 1944 in Paris, France) is a French singer who was popular in the 1960s.

His heyday came during the emergence of French rock.

Career
His main successes were "Sheila", "Baby Face", "Dix petits indiens", "Sur ton visage une larme" (a French version of the song "Una lacrima sul viso" by Bobby Solo), and "Des roses rouges pour un ange blond".

He is one of the few French singers to have performed, in 1977, 33 tours in Nashville with The Jordanaires, the vocal group that sang with Elvis Presley.

In 1978, still in Nashville, he recorded an album of covers entitled Ce vieux cow boy, including, in particular, "Une santé dacier" and "On ne t'oubliera jamais".

He then worked in advertising, before returning to singing in 2006 for a retro show.

He lives in Audierne, a seaside city in southern Finistère, where he lived in the mid-1970s.

Discography
Super 45s
 Betty et Jenny / Je bois, je dors et j'oublie / Baby reste avec moi / C'est merveilleux, Fontana, 1962
 Multiplication / Une fille comme toi / Dis-moi oui / Dans la rue des souvenirs, Fontana, 1962
 Sheila / Avec toi / C'est le mashed potatoes / Isabelle, Fontana, 1962
 Au cœur du silence / Baby Face / Filles / Vous souvenez-vous, Fontana, 1963
 L'autre nuit / Trop sage pour aimer / J'ai un secret à te dire / Comment l'oublier, Fontana, 1963
 Sois gentille / Dans l'eau bleue / Avec des si / Ne pleure pas, Fontana, 1964
 Tu me regretteras / On a toujours ses yeux d'enfant / Clopin clopant / Bien sage, Fontana, 1964
 Une fille me sourit / Sur ton visage une larme / Oh my darling / Roseline, Fontana, 1964
 Un garçon, une fille / Bee boom / Tout le monde un jour / Pour moi, Fontana, 1965
 Des roses pour Marjorie / Des roses rouges pour un ange blond / C'est toi que je préfère / Tu l'oublieras cette fille, Fontana 1965
 Marie aux yeux candides / Chagrin d'amour / Je veux oublier / Au revoir, Fontana, 1965
 Un oiseau sur la mer / Du Cap-Horn à Mexico / Le jeudi c'est fait pour s'amuser / Le soleil est en vacances, Fontana, 1965
 Cincinnati Kid / Une fille tranquille / Bye bye bye, moi je reste / Où est-elle aujourd'hui, Fontana, 1966
 Jusqu'en septembre / C'est une fille en or / C'est bête à pleurer / Julie, Fontana, 1966
 La vie / Tous ces voyages / Dommage, dommage / Ah oui, ah oui, Fontana, 1966
 C'est ma chanson / Sous le soleil exactement / Rien pour faire un mari / Chanson de Maxence, Fontana, 1967
 Le jeu du téléphone / Dans les bras de l'amour / Laurence / Sacré Nestor, Fontana, 1967
 La dernière valse / Tu vivras deux fois / Un monde avec toi / Parfaite, Fontana, 1967
 Goodbye Colette / Chacun son bonheur / J'ai eu si peur / Ne dis jamais que c'est fini, Fontana, 1968
 Les filles de Camaret / Petite Emilie / Vivre une autre vie / Que Paris est triste, La Compagnie, 1969
 45s
 Je rentre chez moi pour Noël / Noël blanc, Canusa, 1968
 Faire woopie / Attends-moi, Revolution, 1969
 Mon cœur est un violon / Pense à moi, Fontana, 1969
 Ma route / Sous les arcades, Fontana, 1969
 Les années 60 (c'était nos années folles à nous) / La musique en tête et le verre à la main, Pathé Marconi  1976 
 Albums 33s
 Multiplication (25 cm), Fontana, 1962
 Dix petits indiens (25 cm), Fontana, 1963
 Sois gentille (25 cm), Fontana, 1963
 Des roses pour Marjorie (30 cm), Fontana, 1965
 Sur ton visage une larme (30 cm), Fontana, 1965, compilation
 Dommage, dommage (30 cm), Fontana, 1966
 La dernière valse (30 cm), Fontana, 1967
 To Elvis from Nashville (30 cm), Philips, 1977
 Ce vieux cow boy (30 cm), Philips, 1978
 CDs
 Le rock c'est ça!, PolyGram Distribution, 1990 ou Twistin' the Rock, Philips-Mercury, 2002
 Tracks: "Betty et Jenny" / "Je bois, je dors et j'oublie" / "Baby reste avec moi" / "C'est merveilleux" / "Multiplication" / "Une fille comme toi" / "Dis-moi oui" / "Dans la rue des souvenirs" / "Hey baby" / "Cri de ma vie" / "C'est le mashed potatoes" / "Isabelle" / "Sheila" / "Avec toi" / "Au cœur du silence" / "Dix petits indiens" / "Filles" / "Vous souvenez-vous" / "Baby face" / "Jenny" / "Tout haut tout bas" / "L'autre nuit" / "Trop sage pour aimer" / "J'ai un secret à te dire" / "Comment l'oublier"
 Multiplication, Mercury, 2003
 Tracks: "Multiplication" / "Hey Baby" / "Baby reste avec moi" / "Cri de ma vie" / "Dis-moi oui" / "Une fille comme toi" / "Dans la rue des souvenirs" / "Betty et Jenny"
 Sur ton visage une larme, Harmonia Mundi, 2004
 "Sur ton visage une larme" / "Des roses rouges pour un ange blond" / "Tout le monde un jour" / "Un monde avec toi" / "My darling Clémentine" / "C'est si bon" / "Over the rainbow" / "La fille d'Ipanema" / "Laura" / "La Mélancolie" / "Paris c'est loin de la mer" / "Lola

References

External links
Letelegramme.fr

1944 births
Living people
French music
French rock singers